This is an incomplete list of military and other armed confrontations that have occurred within the boundaries of the modern US State of Oklahoma since European contact. The region was part of the Viceroyalty of New Spain from 1535 to 1679, New France from 1679 to 1803, and part of the United States of America 1803–present.

The Plains Indian Wars directly affected the region during westward expansion, as did the American Civil War.

Battles

Notes

See also

 History of Oklahoma
 Plains Indians Wars
 Indian Territory in the American Civil War

Battles
Oklahoma
Battles in Oklahoma
Military history of Oklahoma